Ron Keslar (born April 17, 1980) is an American mixed martial artist currently competing in the Welterweight division. A professional competitor since 2006, he has also formerly competed for Bellator, Strikeforce and King of the Cage.

Background
Born and raised in McClellandtown, Pennsylvania, Keslar competed in wrestling at Albert Gallatin High School and Mount Pleasant Area Junior/Senior High School.

Mixed martial arts career

Early career
Keslar made his professional debut in early 2006 and compiled a record of 5–1 before being signed by Strikeforce.

Strikeforce
Keslar made his promotional debut against Chris Cope on June 26, 2010 at Strikeforce: Fedor vs. Werdum and lost via TKO in the second round.

He made his return at Strikeforce: Diaz vs. Noons II on October 9, 2010 against Josh McDonald and lost via unanimous decision.

Keslar's next appearance for the promotion was on January 29, 2011 at Strikeforce: Diaz vs. Cyborg against Eric Lawson. Keslar won via armbar submission in the first round.

Bellator MMA
After his last appearance in Strikeforce, Keslar compiled a record of 3-0 and was signed by Bellator. He made his promotional debut on September 20, 2013 at Bellator 100 against Luis Melo and won via split decision.

Keslar faced controversial fighter War Machine at Bellator 104 on October 18, 2013. He won the fight via technical submission in the first round.

Keslar faced Rick Hawn in the Bellator Season Nine Welterweight Tournament Final. He lost the fight via knockout in the third round.

Keslar faced Karo Parisyan on April 11, 2014 at Bellator 116. Despite winning the first round, he lost the fight via knockout in the second round.

Keslar faced Jesse Juarez on September 19, 2014 at Bellator 125. He lost the fight via unanimous decision.

League S-70
Keslar faced Akop Stepanyan on August 29, 2015 at League S-70: Russia vs. World. He lost via KO (punches).

Championships and accomplishments
Bellator MMA
Bellator Season Nine Welterweight Tournament Runner-Up

Mixed martial arts record

|-
| Loss
| align=center| 11–9
| Danasabe Mohammed
| Submission (guillotine choke)
| Dragon House 22
| 
| align=center| 2
| align=center| 0:49
| San Francisco, California, United States
| 
|-
| Loss
| align=center| 11–8
| Alexei Kunchenko
| KO (punches)
| League S-70: Russia vs. World
| 
| align=center| 3
| align=center| 3:27
| Sochi, Russia
| 
|-
| Loss
| align=center| 11–7
| Jesse Juarez
| Decision (unanimous)
| Bellator 125
| 
| align=center| 3
| align=center| 5:00
| Fresno, California, United States
| 
|-
| Loss
| align=center| 11–6
| Karo Parisyan
| KO (punches)
| Bellator 116
| 
| align=center| 2
| align=center| 4:05 
| Temecula, California, United States
| 
|-
| Loss
| align=center| 11–5
| Rick Hawn
| KO (punch)
| Bellator 109
| 
| align=center| 3
| align=center| 0:55
| Bethlehem, Pennsylvania, United States
| 
|-
| Win 
| align=center| 11–4
| War Machine
| Technical submission (rear-naked choke)
| Bellator 104
| 
| align=center| 1
| align=center| 3:31
| Cedar Rapids, Iowa, United States
| 
|-
| Win
| align=center| 10–4
| Luis Melo
| Decision (split)
| Bellator 100
| 
| align=center| 3
| align=center| 5:00
| Phoenix, Arizona, United States
| 
|-
|Loss
|align=center| 9–4
|Chris Curtis
|Decision (unanimous)
|MMA Xtreme: Fists Will Fly
|
|align=center| 3
|align=center| 5:00
|Evansville, Indiana, United States
| 
|-
| Win
| align=center| 9–3
| Dominic Waters
| Decision (unanimous)
| JW Events: Up and Comers 10
| 
| align=center| 3
| align=center| 5:00
| Stockton, California, United States
| 
|-
| Win
| align=center| 8–3
| James Chaney
| TKO (doctor stoppage)
| Impact MMA: Recognition
| 
| align=center| 1
| align=center| 5:00
| Pleasanton, California, United States
| 
|-
| Win
| align=center| 7–3
| Felipe Fologin
| Decision (split)
| TWC 11: Inferno
| 
| align=center| 3
| align=center| 5:00
| Porterville, California, United States
| 
|-
| Win
| align=center| 6–3
| Eric Lawson
| Submission (armbar)
| Strikeforce: Diaz vs. Cyborg
| 
| align=center| 1
| align=center| 1:57
| San Jose, California, United States
| 
|-
| Loss
| align=center| 5–3
| Josh McDonald
| Decision (unanimous)
| Strikeforce: Diaz vs. Noons II
| 
| align=center| 3
| align=center| 5:00
| San Jose, California, United States
| 
|-
| Loss
| align=center| 5–2
| Chris Cope
| TKO (head kick and punches)
| Strikeforce: Fedor vs. Werdum
| 
| align=center| 2
| align=center| 4:32
| San Jose, California, United States
| 
|-
| Win
| align=center| 5–1
| Jonathan Brandon
| Submission (rear-naked choke)
| KOTC: Arrival
| 
| align=center| 2
| align=center| 0:34
| Highland, California, United States
| 
|-
| Win
| align=center| 4–1
| Darrin Freeman
| Decision (unanimous)
| War Gods/Ken Shamrock Productions: The Valentine's Eve Massacre
| 
| align=center| 3
| align=center| 3:00
| Fresno, California, United States
| 
|-
| Win
| align=center| 3–1
| Kris Bien
| Decision (unanimous)
| UF: Unleashed Fight
| 
| align=center| 3
| align=center| 5:00
| Alpine, California, United States
| 
|-
| Win
| align=center| 2–1
| Michael Musslewhite
| Submission (guillotine choke)
| IFBL: Fight Night 9
| 
| align=center| 1
| align=center| 0:41
| Niles, Ohio, United States
| 
|-
| Loss
| align=center| 1–1
| Matt Major
| Submission (armbar)
| IFBL: Fight Night 7
| 
| align=center| 1
| align=center| 3:48
| Niles, Ohio, United States
| 
|-
| Win
| align=center| 1–0
| Shane Carey
| Submission (rear-naked choke)
| IFBL: Fight Night 5
| 
| align=center| 1
| align=center| 0:31
| Niles, Ohio, United States
|

References

1980 births
Living people
American male mixed martial artists
Mixed martial artists from Pennsylvania
Welterweight mixed martial artists
Middleweight mixed martial artists
Mixed martial artists utilizing wrestling
Mixed martial artists utilizing Brazilian jiu-jitsu
American male sport wrestlers
Amateur wrestlers
American practitioners of Brazilian jiu-jitsu
People awarded a black belt in Brazilian jiu-jitsu
People from Mount Pleasant, Pennsylvania